The Germany women's national under-16 and under-17 basketball team, is controlled by the German Basketball Federation, abbreviated as DBB, and represents Germany in international women's under-16 and under-17 (under age 16 and under age 17) basketball competitions.

World Cup record

See also
 Germany women's national basketball team
 Germany women's national under-19 basketball team
 Germany men's national under-17 basketball team

References

External links

Archived records of Germany team participations

Women's national under-17 basketball teams
Basketball